Amiral Cécille was a protected cruiser of the French Navy, named in honour of Jean-Baptiste Cécille. Like those vessels, Amiral Cécille was intended to be used as a commerce raider to attack merchant shipping. As such, she carried a barque sailing rig to supplement her steam engines for long voyages overseas.

Amiral Cécille had a relatively uneventful career. She spent the early 1890s with the main fleet in the Mediterranean Squadron, where she was primarily occupied with training exercises. After being overhauled in the mid-1890s, she was transferred to the Reserve Squadron in the Mediterranean, where she continued to participate in training maneuvers. The ship detached to join the Naval Division of the Atlantic Ocean in 1899, where she served for the next three years. Recalled home in 1902, she saw no further active service and she was hulked in 1907, before being broken up in 1919.

Design
The first four vessels of the program were wood-hulled unprotected cruisers. A fifth vessel, to have been named Capitaine Lucas, was originally intended along the same lines, but was cancelled in favor of an alternate design by Louis-Émile Bertin, the first protected cruiser of the French fleet. Sfax provided the basis for a pair of similar follow-on ships,  and Amiral Cécille, both of which were ordered in 1885, though neither was designed by Bertin.

The design for Amiral Cécille was prepared by the naval engineer Antoine Lagane, who was the director of the  shipyard in La Seyne-sur-Mer. Lagane submitted it to the Minister of the Navy, Rear Admiral Charles-Eugène Galiber, on 8 April 1885. He adopted the same armament that had been used aboard Sfax—six  guns and ten  guns. After making minor revisions, primarily to the thickness of the deck armor, they approved the design and placed the construction contract on 23 November. On 6 July 1889, while the ship was undergoing sea trials, the navy decided to increase the number of 164.7 mm guns by two, which were installed later that year before she was accepted for active service.

General characteristics and machinery

As was typical for French warships of the period, she had a pronounced tumblehome shape and an overhanging stern. Her superstructure was minimal, consisting primarily of a small conning tower forward. Her hull featured a pronounced ram bow and a short forecastle. Unlike Sfax, Amiral Cécilles bow was not reinforced, so the ram could only be used against light vessels. Her crew consisted of 486 officers and enlisted men, but while serving as a flagship later in her career, this figure increased to 557 to account for the admiral's staff.

The propulsion system for Amiral Cécille consisted of four vertical 2-cylinder compound steam engines that were paired to drive two 4-bladed, bronze screw propellers. Steam was provided by twelve coal-fired, double-ended fire-tube boilers that were ducted into three funnels located amidships. To supplement the steam engines on long voyages, she was originally fitted with a barque sailing rig without royals, with three masts. Coal storage amounted to  normally and  fully loaded. But the ship's propulsion system proved to burn coal at a greater rate than expected, and she never exceeded  with a normal load in service.

Armament and armor
Amiral Cécille was armed with a main battery of eight  M1881 30-caliber (cal.) guns carried in individual pivot mounts. Six of the guns were mounted in sponsons on the upper deck, three on each broadside. One gun was placed in the bow under the forecastle and the other was at the stern on the upper deck as chase guns. These weapons were supported by a secondary battery of ten  M1881 30 cal. guns that were carried in a main deck battery amidships, five guns per broadside with individual gun ports. For close-range defense against torpedo boats, she carried six  M1885 3-pounder Hotchkiss guns and fourteen  1-pounder Hotchkiss revolver cannon, all in individual mounts. She also carried four  torpedo tubes in her hull above the waterline. One was in the bow, one on each broadside, and one in the stern.

Modifications
In 1893, Amiral Cécille received a new suite of primary and secondary guns of the same calibers, but updated to quick-firing types; both 30-caliber M1884 variants. The ship's sailing rig was cut down in 1895 and then removed altogether shortly thereafter, and the bow torpedo tube was removed in 1898. After 1900, a pair of  field guns were placed on the ship, which could be sent ashore with a landing party. The light armament was also revised: the number of 47 mm M1885 guns was increased from six to twelve and the 37 mm guns were removed.

Service history

The keel for Amiral Cécille was laid down at the  shipyard in La Seyne-sur-Mer on 1 September 1886 and her completed hull was launched on 3 May 1888. Named for Admiral Jean-Baptiste Cécille, who saw service in East Asia in the 1840s, the ship was commissioned to begin sea trials on 26 January 1889. The results of her testing were approved on 9 October 1890 and she was placed in full commission the same day. The ship participated in the 1891 fleet maneuvers with the Mediterranean Squadron as part of the cruiser division, along with Tage, the protected cruiser , and the torpedo cruiser . The maneuvers began on 22 June and lasted until 11 July, during which Amiral Cécille operated as part of a hostile fleet attempting to attack the French Mediterranean coast. The maneuvers highlighted the shortage of cruisers sufficiently fast to scout for the main fleet; only Amiral Cécille and Tage were deemed suitable for the task in the evaluation of the exercises.

By 1893, Amiral Cécille had been joined in the Mediterranean Squadron's reconnaissance force by the new armored cruiser  and the protected cruiser . On 25 July, Amiral Cécille accidentally rammed a British freighter that passed in front of her too closely; the latter sank in the collision and Amiral Cécille suffered significant damage to her bow. Repairs were carried out between September 1893 and July 1894 at La Seyne-sur-Mer. During that period, her armament was updated and she had a major overhaul of her boilers. The work was completed in 1895, allowing her to take part in that year's maneuvers as part of Fleet C, along with four ironclads, three other cruisers, and several smaller torpedo craft. The exercises lasted from 1 to 27 July, and on the 15th, Amiral Cécilles propulsion system broke down and she had to return to Toulon for repairs. By 1896, Amiral Cécille had been moved to the Reserve Squadron as part of its cruiser division, along with Sfax, Lalande, and the unprotected cruiser  and the torpedo gunboat . The maneuvers for that year took place from 6 to 30 July and the Reserve Squadron served as the simulated enemy.

In 1899, Amiral Cécille was sent to replace the cruiser  on the Naval Division of the Atlantic Ocean, where she joined Sfax. In late January 1900 she left Fort-de-France, Martinique, for the west coast of Africa. The flotilla assigned to the Atlantic was reduced to Amiral Cécille, Suchet, and the cruiser  in 1901. The ship was recalled home in 1902, had her boilers overhaulled that year, and Amiral Cécille saw no further active service, being assigned to the Special Reserve on 9 January 1903. She was decommissioned on 24 September 1906, struck from the naval register on 27 August 1907, and converted into a hulk the next year to support the school for torpedo boat engine room crews, replacing the old ship of the line , which had accidentally been destroyed by fire. In 1910, she was reassigned to the torpedo school at Toulon, replacing the ironclad , and serving in that role until 1 May 1912. She was then employed as a barracks ship and hulk at Toulon through 1917, replacing the old steam frigate . Amiral Cécille was ultimately listed for sale on 15 March 1919 and was sold to M. Saglia on 21 July to be broken up.

Footnotes

Notes

Citations

References
 
 
 
 
 
 
 
 
 
 
 
 
 
 
 
 

Cruisers of the French Navy
Ships built in France
1888 ships